Our Time Will Come may refer to:
 Our Time Will Come (album), 2014 release by industrial band KMFDM
 Our Time Will Come (film), 2017 Chinese war film